In geometry, a skew polygon is a polygon whose vertices are not all coplanar. Skew polygons must have at least four vertices. The interior surface (or area) of such a polygon is not uniquely defined.

Skew infinite polygons (apeirogons) have vertices which are not all colinear.

A zig-zag skew polygon or antiprismatic polygon has vertices which alternate on two parallel planes, and thus must be even-sided.

Regular skew polygons in 3 dimensions (and regular skew apeirogons in two dimensions) are always zig-zag.

Antiprismatic skew polygon in three dimensions

A regular skew polygon is isogonal with equal edge lengths. In 3 dimensions a regular skew polygon is a zig-zag skew (or antiprismatic) polygon, with vertices alternating between two parallel planes. The side edges of an n-antiprism can define a regular skew 2n-gon.

A regular skew n-gon can be given a Schläfli symbol {p}#{ } as a blend of a regular polygon {p} and an orthogonal line segment { }. The symmetry operation between sequential vertices is glide reflection.

Examples are shown on the uniform square and pentagon antiprisms. The star antiprisms also generate regular skew polygons with different connection order of the top and bottom polygons. The filled top and bottom polygons are drawn for structural clarity, and are not part of the skew polygons.

A regular compound skew 2n-gon can be similarly constructed by adding a second skew polygon by a rotation. These share the same vertices as the prismatic compound of antiprisms.

Petrie polygons are regular skew polygons defined within regular polyhedra and polytopes. For example, the five Platonic solids have 4-, 6-, and 10-sided regular skew polygons, as seen in these orthogonal projections with red edges around their respective projective envelopes. The tetrahedron and the octahedron include all the vertices in their respective zig-zag skew polygons, and can be seen as a digonal antiprism and a triangular antiprism respectively.

Regular skew polygon as vertex figure of regular skew polyhedron 
A regular skew polyhedron has regular polygon faces, and a regular skew polygon vertex figure.

Three infinite regular skew polyhedra are space-filling in 3-space; others exist in 4-space, some within the uniform 4-polytopes.

Isogonal skew polygons in three dimensions
An isogonal skew polygon is a skew polygon with one type of vertex, connected by two types of edges. Isogonal skew polygons with equal edge lengths can also be considered quasiregular. It is similar to a zig-zag skew polygon, existing on two planes, except allowing one edge to cross to the opposite plane, and the other edge to stay on the same plane.

Isogonal skew polygons can be defined on even-sided n-gonal prisms, alternatingly following an edge of one side polygon, and moving between polygons. For example, on the vertices of a cube. Vertices alternate between top and bottom squares with red edges between sides, and blue edges along each side.

Regular skew polygons in four dimensions
In 4 dimensions, a regular skew polygon can have vertices on a Clifford torus and related by a Clifford displacement. Unlike zig-zag skew polygons, skew polygons on double rotations can include an odd-number of sides.

The Petrie polygons of the regular 4-polytopes define regular zig-zag skew polygons. The Coxeter number for each coxeter group symmetry expresses how many sides a Petrie polygon has. This is 5 sides for a 5-cell, 8 sides for a tesseract and 16-cell, 12 sides for a 24-cell, and 30 sides for a 120-cell and 600-cell.

When orthogonally projected onto the Coxeter plane, these regular skew polygons appear as regular polygon envelopes in the plane.

The n-n duoprisms and dual duopyramids also have 2n-gonal Petrie polygons. (The tesseract is a 4-4 duoprism, and the 16-cell is a 4-4 duopyramid.)

See also
Petrie polygon
Quadrilateral#Skew quadrilaterals
Regular skew polyhedron
Skew apeirohedron (infinite skew polyhedron)
Skew lines

Citations

References
 p. 25
 "Skew Polygons (Saddle Polygons)" §2.2
 
Coxeter, H.S.M.; Regular complex polytopes (1974). Chapter 1. Regular polygons, 1.5. Regular polygons in n dimensions, 1.7. Zigzag and antiprismatic polygons, 1.8. Helical polygons. 4.3. Flags and Orthoschemes, 11.3. Petrie polygons
Coxeter, H. S. M. Petrie Polygons. Regular Polytopes, 3rd ed. New York: Dover, 1973. (sec 2.6 Petrie Polygons pp. 24–25, and Chapter 12, pp. 213–235, The generalized Petrie polygon)
 (1st ed, 1957) 5.2 The Petrie polygon {p,q}.
John Milnor: On the total curvature of knots, Ann. Math. 52 (1950) 248–257.
J.M. Sullivan: Curves of finite total curvature, ArXiv:math.0606007v2

External links

Types of polygons